Overture Respighiana (Overtura Respighiana) was composed by Salvatore Di Vittorio in 2008, as an homage to Ottorino Respighi. The work was written one year before Di Vittorio's completion of Respighi's rediscovered first Violin Concerto in A Major.

Instrumentation and duration
The overture is scored for two flutes (II Piccolo), two oboes (II English horn), two clarinets in A, two bassoons, two horns in F, two trumpets, 3 trombones, 1 tuba, timpani, 3 percussion (triangle, antique cymbals, glockenspiel, snare drum, tambourine, cymbals, bass drum, and tam tam), celesta, harp, and strings.

Duration is approximately 7 minutes.

History 
The overture was composed as an homage not only to Ottorino Respighi, but Respighi's homage works on Gioachino Rossini (La Boutique fantasque and Rossiniana).

The beginning of the overture captures the orchestral sounds of the introduction of Pines of Rome, though with new melodies, simultaneously citing elements of Respighi's Rossiniana. Through fanfares, the music leads to a variation of the March from La Boutique fantasque. A brief sarabande styled interlude is given, inspired from the Valse Lente movement of La Boutique fantasque. The final section involves a tarantella dance in the style of Rossini, which ends with a rocket crescendo.

The overture demonstrates Respighi's influence on Di Vittorio, also through Rossini's influence on the music of Respighi.

World premiere and recording 
The overture received its world premiere by the Chamber Orchestra of New York under the composer, on February 13, 2010, at the Church of St. Jean Baptiste in New York. The overture was recorded for Naxos Records:8.572333.

Publisher 
This work was published in 2008 by Edizioni Panastudio in Italy.

References

External links
 Official website of Salvatore Di Vittorio
 Official website of Ottorino Respighi 
 Gruppo Editoriale Panastudio 
 Chamber Orchestra of New York "Ottorino Respighi"
 Naxos Records

Compositions by Salvatore Di Vittorio
2008 compositions
Concert overtures
Respighiana